Leucanthemella is a genus of flowering plants in the sunflower/daisy family Asteraceae.

It contains two species of herbaceous perennials found in marshy habitats. They have hairy foliage and composite daisy-like white flowers in late summer and autumn.

Leucanthemella serotina, autumn ox-eye or giant daisy, is native to Eastern Europe (between Poland, Montenegro, and Ukraine) and widely introduced in (north)western to south-central Europe. It is cultivated in gardens, and has gained the Royal Horticultural Society's Award of Garden Merit. 

Leucanthemella linearis (Matsumura) Tzvelev is native to East Asia. It is found in Russia (Primorye), China (Heilongjiang, Jilin, and Liaoning Provinces), Korea, and Japan (Honshu and Kyushu).

References

Asteraceae genera
Anthemideae